The spotted bush warbler (Locustella thoracica) is a species of Old World warbler in the family Locustellidae.
It is found in the northern Himalayas, Yunnan and central China, in the countries of Bangladesh, Bhutan, China, India, Myanmar and Nepal. Its natural habitat is arboreal forests.

References

spotted bush warbler
Birds of Nepal
Birds of Bhutan
Birds of Central China
Birds of Yunnan
spotted bush warbler
spotted bush warbler
Taxonomy articles created by Polbot